Washington Township is an inactive township in Ripley County, in the U.S. state of Missouri.

Washington Township was erected in 1871, taking its name from one President George Washington.

References

Townships in Missouri
Townships in Ripley County, Missouri